Mahāpadma may refer to

 a legendary treasure in Hindu mythology
 one of the nine treasures of Kubera
 a particular treasure inhabited by a Nāga, and a name of that Naga
 one of the eight treasures connected with Padmini magic
 one of the eight cold hells in Hindu cosmology
 the southernmost of the world-elephants supporting the earth in the Sanskrit epics
 Mahapadma Nanda, a historical Magadha king